Agnes von Rosen (September 8, 1924 – April 4, 2001) was a Swedish aristocrat and bullfighter and stunt performer. She spent most of her later years in Mexico.

Life 
Agnes von Rosen, the daughter of the Swedisn Military Attache to the British Embassy in Stockholm was born on 8 September 1924. Graduating in physiotherapy at Lund University, Sweden, she acted in French and Italian films and had toured in shows throughout America as a bullfighter. She was also related to the House of Bernadotte, Sweden's Royal Family.   

According to The Australian Women's Weekly she became interested in bullfighting after seeing a newsreel of a woman fighting bulls on horseback when she was 12. After marrying Lars Wahlquist she moved to Mexico to pursue her dreams of becoming a bullfighter. She divorced Lars in 1949. By this time she was the mother of Christina Sabine Maud von Rosen and Johan Wahlquist.

In September 1955, the 'Hell Drivers' opened their ‘Hollywood Tournament of Thrills’ at the Sydney Showground. This 'tournament' brought together some of the world's greatest stunt drivers for a night of thrills and spills during which they performed over 22 different stunts. One of these stunts was done by Agnes von Rosen who was pulled behind one of the cars as it hurtled through a wall of flames.

Agnes von Rosen died in Mexico on 11 April 2001 aged 76.

References 

Stunt performers
Bullfighters
1924 births
2001 deaths
Swedish expatriates in Mexico
Lund University alumni
Swedish actresses